Garth is a superhero appearing in  American comic books published by DC Comics, commonly associated with Aquaman and the Teen Titans. Created by writer Robert Bernstein and artist Ramona Fradon, he first appears in Adventure Comics #269 in February 1960. He was originally known as the first incarnation of Aqualad. As a young adult, the character used the alias Tempest.

In the DC Universe, the character starts out originally as the teen sidekick and protégé to his guardian, the superhero known as Aquaman, originally possessing similar abilities. Unlike his guardian and mentor, the character is a fully-blooded Atlantean and originates from a tribe in Atlantis known as the Idyllist, a peaceful tribe mostly consisting of pacifists. As Garth was born with purple eyes, an anomaly signifying an evil lineage, he was cast out despite his royal status. He survives and eventually meets Aquaman, who takes in the boy as an adopted son and protégé. After acting as a member of the Teen Titans, Garth eventually abandons the Aqualad role and adopts the Tempest alias, having bolstered his newfound magical abilities with training. He would act as one of Aquaman's most trusted allies. He also fulfilled numerous roles in Atlantis, including being an ambassador, prince, and once succeeded his mentor as ruler of Atlantis.

In more recent continuities, the character shares a similar history although the Idyllist people are instead Atlanteans with powers to see the previous history of Atlantis, in which said ability manifests with purple eyes and is misconstrued as a sign of dark magic. Raised by his mother and later Aquaman, Garth's magical abilities were fostered through a prestigious guild in Atlantis that instructs magic though Garth left the guild after a mystic accident. Garth would then act as both a soldier in Atlantis and a superhero on the surface, notably as a member of the Teen Titans and Titans, while remaining an ally of Aquaman. He would eventually meet his successor, Jackson Hyde. Garth granted him the Aqualad moniker.

Garth has made several appearances as both Aqualad and Tempest in various media. As Aqualad, he appeared in the Teen Titans animated series, and the Batman: The Brave and the Bold animated series. He made his live adaptation debut in the second season of the DC Universe series Titans, played by Drew Van Acker. Garth also appeared as Tempest in the Young Justice animated series.

Publication history

Aqualad first appeared in 1960 in Adventure Comics #269 and was created by Robert Bernstein and Ramona Fradon. In 1996, Aqualad appeared in his own 4-issue limited series, under a new alias: Tempest. In the 2009–2010 miniseries, Blackest Night, Tempest is murdered in battle.

Fictional character biography

Origin
Aqualad was initially known as Aquaman's teenage partner, and like many other such "kid sidekicks" popular in the Silver Age, his powers originally varied very little from his mentor. Aqualad was a founding member of the Teen Titans.

His origin is similar to that of his mentor. He is an amphibious humanoid who was left to die because of ancient Atlantean superstition and prophecy. He is the prince and heir to the throne of the Idyllists, a colony of Atlanteans who settled in the Hidden Valley 4,000 years ago. There, nestled in the capital city of Shayeris (formerly Crastinus), the pacifist Idyllists became rabid builders and collectors, architects and artisans, and eschewed physical violence at all costs. The Idyllists were also practitioners of magic and kept an extensive library of mystical texts and scrolls.

Before Garth's birth, his parents, King Thar and Queen Berra, became the reigning monarchs of Shayeris, the capital of The Hidden Valley of colonies. Thar had inherited the throne and access to ancient magical energies that his brother Zath, a powerful magician in his own right, believed to be rightfully his. Zath practiced dark sorcery and necromancy and was eventually banished from the Hidden Valley. His body transformed into a disgusting half-human form, Zath, renamed Slizzath, returned to Shayeris twenty years later with an army of undead. He planned to invade the Hidden Valley and transform it into a necropolis he would rule.

King Thar knew of this and assembled an armory of robots and weapons to stop his demented brother. The Idyllist radicals killed him and banished his pregnant wife Berra back to Atlantis. Before Thar was killed, however, he was able to cast a magical spell that trapped Slizzath in an other-dimensional prison. Unfortunately, this spell was linked to a magical ritual which would give his offspring access to incredible mystical powers and accessing that ritual would give Slizzath the energy required to break free of his prison. So word was sent out that all babies born with purple eyes, the Idyllist mark of power, should be banished and killed, lest they try to perform the access ritual and accidentally free Slizzath and his undead army. The Idyllists also claimed that Thar had gone insane to hide their complex, fearful plan.

In Poseidonis, one of the domed cities of Atlantis, Queen Berra gave birth to her baby boy, Garth, who was born with purple eyes. The Atlanteans claimed Garth had been born genetically inferior and sentenced him to death on a seabed leagues away from Atlantis. It has been speculated that with the assistance of Aquaman's father, the Atlantean sorcerer Atlan, the young Garth not only survived but thrived, learning language and survival rituals to keep the young boy from going feral as he scavenged his way through the undersea. Garth developed an intense fear of schools of fish, however, which haunted him into his teens.

Sidekick and Titan

Eventually, Garth met and rescued Aquaman and became his sidekick, Aqualad. As Aqualad, Garth was given to expressions such as "Great Guppies!", "Suffering Sardines," "Leapin' Lionfish!", and "Suffering Snails!" Together Garth and Aquaman shared many adventures. Once Aquaman married his lady love, Mera, and had his own son, adventuring with Aqualad became less important to him, leaving Garth feeling unsure of his role in his mentor's life.

Seeking to be of help to other teens in trouble, Garth became one of the founding members of the Teen Titans. Still shunned by many Poseidonians despite his heroics on their behalf, Aqualad was sent away to be schooled in Scotland, at a school on the shores of Loch Ness, as seen in the Teen Titans series. Soon, life for Garth became increasingly difficult, both at home and away. Mera was kidnapped, forcing the Aqua-duo to go in search of her, during which time Garth's left arm was nearly severed by an attacker. While he mended in the hospital, a plot against the Crown developed and Aqualad was forced to escape, finding that he was being deliberately overmedicated to keep him from thwarting the usurpers.

While on a quest to assist Aquaman, Garth was kidnapped and forced to fight a giant sea beast to the death, surviving just long enough for Aquaman to defeat the monster. Little did Garth know that, before long, he would be forced to defend himself in a life or death struggle against his mentor over the survival of the infant Arthur Jr. (AKA "Aquababy"). Betrayed and abandoned by Aquaman, Garth stayed in the Hidden Valley to search for links to his identity, eventually finding out he was the lost prince of the Idyllists, though it would be several more years before he learned the truth about his father's murder and his mother's complicity in his exile at the hands of the Poseidonians.

Also as a teenager, Garth met and fell in love with Aquagirl (Tula), the impetuous and feisty Atlantean ward of Aquaman's predecessor, King Juvor. They dated for years, aiding Aquaman as defenders of the undersea realms, until Tula's death at the hands of Chemo during the Crisis on Infinite Earths. Grief-stricken, Garth left Atlantis, rejoined the Teen Titans on a number of occasions, and saw his relationship with Aquaman become violent and strained.

As a result of his grief and repeated telepathic abuse by Mento, among other factors, Aqualad lost his ability to control marine life. While he later regained this power during the Millennium event, it came with the condition that his commands must now be phrased as requests to the creatures to perform desired actions, although the animals apparently need little persuasion.

Garth nearly joined the list of casualties during "Titans Hunt," an all-out attempt to wipe out the former teen sidekicks and their allies. While trying to free the ascending Golden Eagle from the clutches of a member of the Wildebeest Society, Aqualad fell from a great height, his body mangled and his bones shattered on the rocks of a sea wall below. Rescued by the (then) reformed Steve Dayton and Deathstroke, Garth was confined to a tank and left to be cared for by S.T.A.R. Labs physicians, who found that they could do little for him due to his Atlantean physiology.

After the boy nearly died twice, the Titans called for Aquaman, who took Garth to the Idyllists in the hopes that their metaphysical cures might save him. While at the edge of death, Garth saw Tula and begged to join her in the Great Beyond, but was instead revived by Tusky the walrus. Angered that Arthur had yet again abandoned him and, worse, with people he thought hated him, he fought with his mentor but eventually they parted as friends.

Tempest
Some time later, Garth encountered a band of shark-like merpeople who attacked the hero with a kind of "mystic water". Garth vanished and reappeared in another dimension, where Atlan awaited to train him. Atlan taught Garth to use powers the young Idyllist did not know he possessed, including elemental powers which allowed him to heat and cool water and create whirlpools, as well as fiery purple blasts of energy from his eyes. Toward the end of his training, Garth was scarred in a ritual, leaving two pronounced scars over his right eye which healed into "tattoos" once he had conquered his inner turmoil. Atlan told Garth that the final part of his training was to complete the ritual that would grant him full access to his ancestral magical power, and thus Garth had to return to Shayeris, in the Hidden Valley.

Garth returned to our dimension at nearly the same time he left, although he was approximately three years older upon his return. When Garth, alongside Atlan, returned to Shayeris, he found the city overtaken by undead creatures. Completely unaware of his own history or his uncle's powers of necromancy, Garth was ill-prepared for the sudden return of Aquagirl, risen from the grave. Together with Letifos (one of the shark warriors), Atlan, and Aquagirl, Garth descended into Shayeris. Just the sheer proximity to the ancient pool of ancestral magic allowed Garth to tap into the power, and charged with the purple energy, he recreated his costume out of the Idyllist red and black flag and renamed himself Tempest.

Tempest then found his father's sanctum and performed the magical ritual which would give him his power. The false Aquagirl, a magical conduit for Slizzath, attacked Tempest and channeled that power into Slizzath, releasing the monster from his other-dimensional prison. Using his stolen power, Slizzath captured Tempest and Atlan, raised an enormous undead army, and finally transformed the Hidden Valley into the necropolis of which he had long dreamed.

Tempest eventually broke free of his prison and found the remaining Idyllists, hiding in Thar's old armory. There, Tempest was reunited with his mother and the truth—that the fearful Idyllists were so terrified of the release of Slizzath, they lied about Thar's sanity and saw to it that Garth was banished as an infant. Disgusted, Garth took control of the armory and a small number of Idyllist warriors and attacked Slizzath. Tempest destroyed the Aquagirl zombie that had seduced him and, using his full range of powers, sent his uncle back into the other-dimensional prison void, sealing the portal forever.

Family
After a tearful goodbye to Aquagirl, Tempest returned to Atlantis where he became the city's official ambassador to the UN. His relationship with Aquaman became more tumultuous, and Garth later learned that Aquaman had another son from a dalliance with an Inuit woman. This son, Koryak, grew to resent Tempest and the two became bitter rivals for some time. More friction arose between Tempest and Aquaman when Aquaman's lover, Dolphin, left him for Tempest (who had not been aware of the other relationship), but the two have since resolved their differences.

Tempest and Dolphin were soon married, with the young maid pregnant of a young son, named Cerdian by his godfather, Aquaman. At the same time, Tempest joined a new incarnation of his old team, the Titans, playing part-time adventurer as well as royal politician and new father. He also played a prominent role in the Imperiex War, not only transferring Atlantis to the past when it faced destruction with the detonation of an Imperiex probe, but subsequently providing Darkseid with a magical focus for his powers that would enable Superman to send both Imperiex and Brainiac-13 back to the Big Bang, thus defeating both of them simultaneously.

The weight of new familial responsibilities initially strained the relationship between Dolphin and Tempest, and she demanded that he choose between his duties as a hero and his duties as a father and husband. Reluctantly, Tempest complied and quit the Titans. Another weight on his matrimonial life came when a new sorcerer elite took over the government of Atlantis after its return from the Obsidian Age. As friends of the deposed king, both Tempest and his wife fell under suspicion and, as suspected traitors, were put under house arrest. Tempest always managed to sneak out, sometimes briefly adventuring with his former mentor and helping him, but always leaving his wife behind.

When finally Prime Minister Hagen fell from his chief role and Aquaman returned to Atlantis, Tempest returned to his home and seemingly reconciled with his wife and son, but only briefly. While Tempest was trying to channel the magic of all the Atlantis Sorcerers for the purpose of prying secrets from the duplicitous fallen prime ministers mind (to undo a spell he'd cast that turned Mera into an air-breather), the Spectre sensed the strong magic power Tempest attempted to harness and, following his crusade against magic and magicians, unleashed his strength on Atlantis. The inhabitants of the undersea city paid the toll, and Tempest, target of the Spectre's wrath, is now missing. When Aquaman searched for him, he was only able to find part of his uniform in the presumed place of his death.

"One Year Later"
As part of the "One Year Later" storyline, the solicitation for Aquaman: Sword of Atlantis #51 reveals that Tempest will "[try] to help Arthur recover the Trident of Poseidon". Tempest was found by Cal Durham and the people of Sub Diego in issue #50, amnesiac and unable to process water into oxygen, with a post-hypnotic suggestion warning Arthur and Orin of the upcoming fight with their nemesis, Issitoq the Narwal. For the time being, he seems to have lost the ability to process water and any mystical abilities. He has been portrayed in other DC comics (besides Aquaman) as having regained his abilities. During the events of issues 51–57, Garth encounters Black Manta, who belittles him yet spares his life as a nod to the "cripple" he has become.

As Manta attempts to murder Arthur and Cal Durham, Garth destroys the Mantamen's ion cannon and thwarts Manta's plans. Deeply depressed about his physical condition and fearing the fates of Dolphin and Cerdian, Garth is introduced to a sorceress named Leah who leads him to a spacecraft she'd used to transport herself from a mystical city where the young mage might find the answer to his troubles. In issue 56, he boards the ship and leaves in search of his family.

Final Crisis
In Final Crisis #5, Tempest is aiding Hawkgirl and Green Lantern against the siege on Checkmate's castle. He apparently gained his powers back and his old appearance.

He later returns to Atlantis to aid his friend, Letifos, into rebuilding the aquatic city. He eventually decides to have a private celebration for Dolphin and Cerdian, claiming that even if they may have survived the Spectre's attack, they were surely buried in the rubble of Atlantis with the other fugitives from the shattered town. His version is confirmed by Slizzath, his necromantic uncle and enemy, that, foretelling the Blackest Night, essentially forces Tempest to use his sorcery might on him, committing suicide in a bid to take the Black Lantern power for himself.

Inspired by Dick Grayson, who speaks to him as the new Batman, and by Letifos, who shows him the empty throne of Atlantis with Aquaman's original costume, which had been left there by Arthur Joseph in a pilgrimage, Tempest decides to crown himself new king of Atlantis, waiting for Mera to return and guide the survivors.

Blackest Night
In Blackest Night #2, Garth visits Aquaman's grave with Mera to relocate his remains to Atlantis, but they are interrupted by Aquaman, Tula, and Dolphin; now reanimated as Black Lanterns. A conflict ensues resulting in Garth's death and he is promptly reanimated as a member of the Black Lantern Corps. Soon afterwards, Tempest and other Black Lantern Titans appear to attack the Titans. They follow Dawn Granger, the current Dove, to Titans Tower, where more Black Lantern Titans are attacking the living heroes.

Holly Granger (the current Hawk and Dove's partner who had shortly beforehand been killed and transformed into a Black Lantern) confronts Dove, overwhelming her and places her hand on Dove's chest to steal her heart. Dove suddenly radiates a white energy that completely destroys Holly's body and severs her connection to her ring. Dove then turns the light on the other Black Lanterns, destroying all but Hank Hall, Tempest, and Terra, who quickly retreat. Garth is later seen in Coast City, where he is destroyed by the Atom and Atrocitus after they combine their rings' powers.

In the aftermath of the battle at Coast City, Garth and Holly are given memorial statues in Titans Tower.

The New 52 and beyond
Following the 2011 "Flashpoint" storyline, and the subsequent New 52 reboot of the DC Comics' superhero continuity, Garth did not appear for some time. A passing reference to Garth was made in Red Hood and the Outlaws along with Cyborg, Lilith, Dick, Gar and a new unseen character named Dustin, as members of the Teen Titans that Starfire seemingly no longer remembers. Another reference is made in Aquaman, in which a shadowy Atlantean woman is seen reporting to the current King of Atlantis, Ocean Master, about the attacks made upon the boy born with purple eyes, who is believed by some to bring the end of Atlantis. Ocean Master orders the boy, whose name is revealed as Garth, to be returned to his mother unharmed.

Garth has since made his appearance known and is among an elite force that Mera (who later is revealed to be her sister Siren) put together to hunt down Aquaman. Their ranks include besides Garth, King Shark, Scylla, Charybdis, and Ch'tok. Later, Garth is made Director of Communications of the newly established Atlantean embassy on land.

The Titans Hunt (2015–2016) series later establishes Garth was a part of the Teen Titans several years ago, along with Robin, Speedy, Wonder Girl and others, but like his teammates had his memories of their time together erased for his own safety. After the events of DC Rebirth, Garth is once again part of an older Titans team which includes Nightwing, Arsenal, Donna Troy, Lilith Clay, and the newly returned Wally West. Wally's return helps the group recover their full memories, establishing that they have all been friends since forming the Teen Titans as children.

Characterization

Family lineage 
A reoccurring theme in Garth's character is his biological familial connections and its impact on his life, similarly to Aquaman's character.

 Garn Daanuth - An ancient Atlantean demigod and evil sorcerer affiliated with the Lords of Chaos and a significant figure in Atlantean history prior to its sinking. He (along with Arion) is alluded by Thar to have started a reoccurring theme in Atlantis where brothers are pitted against one another for rulership. It is alleged by Garth himself during his time in the Teen Titans that he is likely an ancestor to Garn Daanuth, giving credence to his outcast status from his purple eyes, a sign of black magic in which Garn specialized in. He also believed that his name itself coincidentally was a corruption of the evil sorcerer's name (Garn Daanuth).
 Thar - Garth's biological father. Inheriting the power to access magical energy through their bloodline, Thar was made king of the Idyllist despite being younger than his brother, Slizzath. Considered a common theme in Atlantean history for brothers to fight once another, Thar would banish his brother although he would return with an undead army. Thar would seal away his brother although the same ancestral magics inherited by members of the bloodline was linked to his extradimensional prison, making any heirs Thar may conceive risk freeing his brother, thus he inadvertently led to Garth being exiled as a baby due to inheriting the Idyllist royal bloodline's mark, purple eyes. Due to this, Garth was characterized later in his life to admonish his father for his decision. 
 Berra - Garth's biological mother; formerly the Queen of the Idyllist, she was banished soon after becoming pregnant with Thar's son in tandem to his instruction for any point he may conceive an heir. Shortly after he was born and witnessed his purple eyes, Berra abandoned her infant son. In his later life, Garth would be characterized to think poorly of his biological mother for abandoning him. Berra is indirectly mentioned in the New 52 reboot, her history changed to having raised her son. Her connections to the Idyllist remains unknown.
 Slizzath - Garth's biological uncle. Although he was the elder royal prince, Slizzarth was denied his inheritance due to having practiced necromancy and black magic. In retaliation, he attempted to take the throne by force using his advanced magical abilities. Thar would succeed in sealing him away, although the spell cast was incomplete and his imprisonment was linked to a ritual spell for those of the Idyllist royal line to inherit the full extent of the ancestral latent magical abilities. Slizzath would be released decades later when Garth performed the ritual spell, initially unaware. He is eventually defeated by his nephew.

Powers and abilities
As an Atlantean, he possess their shared attributes of powers granted by their physiology: he is able to breathe underwater indefinitely, possesses superhuman physical abilities that allows him to freely move underwater and withstand the pressures of the deep ocean. He can survive at depths of up to 3,400 feet below surface level. His body contains fluids that adjust to give him buoyancy at varying depths. His body also produces gases that push out against the ocean pressures as heavily as they push in, preventing him from being crushed at great depths. His body is also highly impervious to physical injury. His bloodstream is filled with an amino acid that keeps his body from freezing in the ocean depths, although his own temperature is naturally quite high, allowing his muscles the heat they need to swim at such high speeds. Tempest can swim at speeds of 73.86 knots (or 85 mph). Tempest has excellent close range vision and he can see particularly well in low light. His sense of hearing is particularly acute, although, because the rate sound travels on dry land is different than beneath the water, his hearing is directly linked to his vision. He also has a powerful sense of smell. Tempest is amphibious and is able to breathe under water by extracting oxygen from the water through tiny pores in his skin.

As the alleged descendant of the evil ancient Atlantean demigod Garn Daanuth, he possess magical powers that are the result of mystic energies of his magical ancestors mixing with their genetic line. His magical powers allow him to perform a myriad of abilities such as his psionic ability to generate extreme temperatures of cold or heat in bodies of water, project optic blasts powerful enough to stun and/or knock a gray whale unconscious and kill a normal human being although he can alter its lethal intent. Other magical abilities include mystical senses, telepathy, telekinesis, dimensional traveling, demonic summoning, and ability to commune with entities connected to the elemental force known as the Blue (or Clear). After the New 52 reboot, Garth's purple eyes denote a line of Atlanteans whose powers include having an encyclopedia memory of his kingdom's history.

In addition to his super-powers, Garth is considered a skilled warrior adept with various weaponry and hand-to-hand combat. He is also considered intelligent and a competent ambassador. Garth also possess a vast amount of wealth due to his royal connections, once having served as the Titan's chief financer. As an ambassador, he also enjoys a level of diplomatic immunity.

Weaknesses 
As with all other Atlanteans, Garth dehydrates at a faster rate than humans. Originally, the character was expressed to be able to survive for one hour although later versions of this character lacked a specified time limit before the character could dehydrate while on dry air. Despite having enhanced senses is also partially color blind, almost unable to distinguish between black, green, and blue.

Other versions
On Earth-15, a world where sidekicks have taken on their mentors' identities, an older version of Garth has been shown to have taken up the mantle of Aquaman. He is subsequently killed by Superman-Prime.
In the Elseworlds series Kingdom Come, Garth is depicted as the future protector of Atlantis, "Aquaman". He marries Debbie Perkins (aka Deep Blue), and they have a daughter, Tula (Aquagirl).
In the alternate timeline of the 2011 "Flashpoint" storyline, Garth is framed by Artemis, for the death of Hippolyta on the wedding day of Aquaman and Wonder Woman. Garth is killed by Philippus before he can tell Aquaman that Artemis was collaborating with Orm.
In the Teen Titans: Earth One series, Tempest is featured among those who were experimented on by STAR Labs. Unlike the others, he was raised in captivity, due to his fish-like appearance and only known as Tempest. He was brought along by the others when they ran away, as he does not speak, and only has basic understandings of situations. He was given the ability of hydrokinesis, and can breathe underwater. However, he can only survive on land for short periods without special equipment.

In other media

Television

 Garth as Aqualad appears in The Superman/Aquaman Hour of Adventure, voiced by Jerry Dexter.
 Garth as Aqualad appears in Teen Titans, voiced by Wil Wheaton. This version possesses hydrokinesis and is assisted by series original character Tramm. Following his first appearances in the episode "Deep Six" and becoming an honorary member of the Teen Titans, he helps found Titans East.
 Garth as Aqualad appears in the Robot Chicken episode "They Took My Thumbs", voiced by Clare Grant.
 Garth as Aqualad appears in the Batman: The Brave and the Bold episode "Sidekicks Assemble!", voiced by Zack Shada as a teenager and by Zachary Gordon as a child. This version is resentful of the praise that Aquaman receives.
 Garth appears in Young Justice, voiced by Yuri Lowenthal. This version is Kaldur'ahm's best friend who was offered to join Aquaman as his pupil, but declined to become a student of the Atlantean Conservatory of Sorcery. Additionally, Garth joined the Team in between seasons one and two, but left following Tula's death. As of season three, Young Justice: Outsiders, Garth has become an ambassador for Atlantis at the United Nations.
 Garth as Aqualad appears in Teen Titans Go! (2013), voiced again by Wil Wheaton.
 Garth as Aqualad appears in Titans, portrayed by Drew Van Acker. This version is a founding member of the original iteration of the Titans who possesses hydrokinesis and is attracted to Donna Troy, with whom he has a one-night stand before she returns to Themyscira without telling him. Furious, he confronts her at the airport, where they profess their love for each other. Garth later sacrifices himself to save Troy's Amazon handler Jillian from Deathstroke.
 Garth as Aqualad appears in DC Super Hero Girls, voiced by Jessica McKenna. This version is a student at Metropolis High School and member of the "Invincibros" with a boyish voice and appearance and whose last name is "Bernstein".

Film
 The Teen Titans incarnation of Garth / Aqualad makes a cameo appearance in Teen Titans: Trouble in Tokyo.
 The Flashpoint incarnation of Garth appears in Justice League: The Flashpoint Paradox as a member of Aquaman's army.
 Garth as Aqualad makes a cameo appearance in Teen Titans Go! To the Movies.

Video games
 Garth as Tempest appears as an unlockable character in Aquaman: Battle for Atlantis.
 The Young Justice incarnation of Garth as Tempest appears as a playable character in Young Justice: Legacy, voiced again by Yuri Lowenthal.

Miscellaneous
 Parodies of Aquaman and Aqualad named Mermaid Man and Barnacle Boy appear in SpongeBob SquarePants.
 The Teen Titans incarnation of Garth / Aqualad appears in Teen Titans Go! (2004). Additionally, a villainous, alternate universe version of Aqualad, Tempest, appears in issue #48 as a member of the Teen Tyrants.

References

External links
 
 

DC Comics sidekicks
Comics characters introduced in 1960
DC Comics Atlanteans
DC Comics characters who can move at superhuman speeds
DC Comics characters who use magic
DC Comics characters with superhuman strength
DC Comics characters who can teleport 
DC Comics characters who have mental powers
DC Comics metahumans
DC Comics male superheroes
DC Comics telekinetics 
DC Comics telepaths 
DC Comics child superheroes
Fictional activists
Fictional characters with superhuman durability or invulnerability
Fictional characters with superhuman senses
Fictional characters with water abilities
Fictional characters with dimensional travel abilities
Fictional mermen and mermaids
Superheroes who are adopted
Characters created by Robert Bernstein
Teenage characters in comics